Tonight It's Now or Never is a 2002 album by American Alt country group Blue Mountain.

2002 albums
Blue Mountain (band) albums